Luna Park Melbourne is a historic amusement park located on the foreshore of Port Phillip Bay in St Kilda, Melbourne, Victoria. It opened on 13 December 1912, with a formal opening a week later, and has been operating almost continuously ever since.

History
Luna Park was built by American showman J.D. Williams, together with the Phillips brothers Harold, Leon and Herman. Not much is known of their background, but they were involved in the building of picture theatres in Spokane, Washington and Vancouver before coming to Sydney in 1909 and quickly establishing a chain of luxury cinemas in that city and then Melbourne. 

They then took the lease of the Dreamland site, a failed amusement park on the St Kilda foreshore, and reputedly brought out experts directly from the birthplace of the amusement park, Coney Island in New York, to build an up to date attraction. It was to be named Luna Park, perhaps after the first park of that name, the 1903 Luna Park on Coney Island, or Luna Park, Seattle, opened in 1906. Melbourne's Luna Park opened on 13 December 1912, to huge crowds and was an immediate success.

It is not clear exactly who designed the famous mouth entrance; T.S. Eslick is credited with the design of the park in the opening day brochure, and as the 'engineer-in-chief' in contemporary newspaper reports, while Vernon Churchill was described as the scenic artist "in whose fertile brain the various attractions have been arranged".

In the years before World War I, the park was a great success, with attractions such as the Scenic Railway, Palais de Folies (later Giggle Palace), River Caves of the World, Penny Arcade, a Whitney Bros 'while-u-wait' photo booth, the American Bowl Slide, as well as live performances in the Palace of Illusions and on a permanent high-wire. Williams returned to the US around 1913, and helped found First National Films which subsequently became Warner Brothers. The Phillips brothers stayed on and ran the park until their deaths in the 1950s.

Luna Park closed for the war, although the Scenic Railway continued to operate, and the park itself was still used for "patriotic or fund-raising events". It did not re-open until an extensive overhaul in 1923 added new and improved attractions, such as the Big Dipper roller coaster, a water chute, a Noah's Ark, and a four-row carousel made in 1913 by the Philadelphia Toboggan Company (that had previously been at White City in Sydney).

Between the wars, a number of new attractions were made, including dodgem cars in 1926-7, and in 1934, a ghost train. In the 1950s, the park was refurbished, including the addition of The Rotor in 1951. The park remained popular throughout the 1950s, 1960s and into the late 1970s, when some of the earlier attractions began to be replaced by modern mechanical rides. A fire in 1981 destroyed the Giggle Palace, and in the same year the River Caves were declared unsafe, and demolished. In 1989, the Big Dipper was demolished in anticipation of a new large roller coaster which never eventuated. The ride was also demolished due to safety concerns with its age, following a major derailment, that injured 20 people, on the older rollercoaster, the Scenic Railway.

The main historic features of the park to remain include the iconic "Mr Moon" face entry and flanking towers (1912, restored 1999), the Scenic Railway (1912), which is the oldest continuously operating roller coaster in the world, and the carousel (1913 restored 2000). Other historic attractions include the ghost train (1934), and the fairytale-castle-style dodgems building constructed to house the newly patented ride in 1927 (the ride itself was relocated from the first floor of this building to the ground level in the late 1990s).

The park also includes many modern attractions such as the Coney Drop, the Spider, a ferris wheel, and other mechanical thrill-rides. The park remains popular with children and their parents who have fond memories of the park from their youth.

The remaining 28 years of a 50 years lease for Luna Park was sold in 1998, when two superannuation funds represented by BCR Asset Management bought it for $3 million. They spent $10 million on extensive refurbishments, upgrading the services and safety for the first time in decades, upgrading existing rides and installing new ones, whilst retaining the fun-fair, fantasy themes. The Scenic Railway was overhauled, the face rebuilt, with a new fibreglass version placed over the remnants of the original plaster one, and the towers repainted in their traditional primary colours. The carousel was also restored, returning the horses and the painted decoration to their original 1913 appearance.

A consortium headed by Melbourne transport magnate Lindsay Fox bought Luna Park in early 2005, pledging to restore it to the glory he remembers from his 1940s youth, spent in nearby Windsor. As of 2021, none of these plans have come to fruition, but the Scenic Railway Station was given a facelift. Between December 2007 and June 2008, a major section of the Scenic Railway underwent major repairs and in 2010 the Coney Island Top Drop (a replica of Coney Tower at Coney Island's Luna Park) was purchased directly from Zamperla.

The park's triangular beachfront site is on government land, bounded by the O'Donnell Gardens on one side and Cavell Street on the other. Across this street is a larger triangle of foreshore crown land known as the 'Triangle Site', occupied by the grand 1920s Palais Theatre, the 1970s Palace nightclub (burned down in 2007), and car parking. The City of Port Phillip, in consultation with the Victorian State Government, ran a tender process in 2007 to restore the Palais Theatre and redevelop the remainder of the site. Lindsay Fox was part of a consortium that submitted a proposal which was unsuccessful.

The remaining heritage features of the park are listed on the National Trust of Australia, and the face and towers and Scenic Railway, and the carousel and its canopy, are listed on the Victorian Heritage Register.

In 2011 and 2012 Luna Park's sign was rebuilt in fibreglass. Work was done on the face while under scaffolding with a material with Mr Moon and the towers printed on it. On 13 December 2012, the amusement park celebrated its centenary. In August 2013, it was announced that a new permanent thrill ride would be installed in the coming months. The ride replaced the G-Force and was revealed to be a permanent installation of the Power Surge, which had previously been a seasonal ride.

In 2014–15 the 'House of Carnivale' was built in the site that had once been the Jack'n'Jill, and later the Pinball Arcade, with food venues on the ground level and a function room upstairs. This was the first permanent building on the Luna Park site since the ghost train in 1936.

Other Luna Parks

Luna Park in St Kilda spawned three other Luna Parks that were eventually built or planned around Australia, and there were another two places that used the name.

In 1930 the Phillips brothers branched out and built a second Luna Park in the Adelaide seaside suburb of Glenelg, managed by David Atkins. The Glenelg park had an exact clone of Melbourne's Big Dipper that operated at Sydney until 1979. In the face of Council's refusal to lower the rental, and local opposition, when a site in Sydney became available in Milsons Point Sydney, they dismantled the rides and relocated the venture. With a new face entrance and a version of the Giggle Palace called Coney Island, Luna Park Sydney was an immediate success, and still operates, albeit with the loss of most original rides.

In 1938 T. S. Eslick reappeared in Australia and built the Cloudland Ballroom which was originally called Luna Park, and had a few rides clustered around it.  World War II intervened, and the park was soon closed, with the ballroom reopening in 1942 to become a popular part of the Brisbane entertainment scene until its shock demolition in 1982.

In 1944 a small cluster of amusements on the foreshore of the seaside Brisbane suburb of Redcliffe adopted the name Luna Park, and operated until the last ride closed in the late 1960s.

Another collection of rides, complete with a much-simplified version of the mouth entrance, opened in the Perth seaside suburb of Scarborough, Western Australia in 1939. It lasted 33 years before being demolished in 1972 for a shopping centre.

Current rides

Speedy Beetle – Spinning children's roller coaster manufactured by SBF Visa Group. Opened in 2019. Replaced the aging Silly Serpent ride.
Moon Balloons – Enjoy the smooth glide to the top as your balloon lifts up to the skies! Small version of the classic Ferris wheel.
The Great Scenic Railway – Opened in December 1912, the Scenic Railway is the second oldest operating roller coaster in the world (after the 1902 Leap-The-Dips in Pennsylvania), the oldest continually operating roller coaster in the world, and one of only seven remaining roller coasters that require a brakeman to stand in the middle of the train. For these reasons, it is regarded as an ACE Coaster Classic. Originally built from 65,674m of Canadian Oregon pine (Douglas Fir), the track is 967 metres long. The Scenic Railway's scaffolding is made up of 322 posts. Each train weighs nearly 2 tonnes and reaches speeds of 60 km/h. The Scenic train shed, behind Pharaoh's Curse, is heritage listed.
Sky Rider ferris wheel – Built 1971, moved slightly in 2001 in the parks refurbishment to fit the enterprise.
Twin Dragon – A Japanese-built Pirate ship dragon type ride, pendulum swings.
Supernova – Built and installed in 2019. Take to the skies for a 360° spin on this giant tower that will make you want to scream with joy!
Red Baron – Built 2001
The Ghost Train – A ghost train which retains its 1934 tracks. The ghost train was purchased from the Pretzel Amusement Ride Company in 1934. It is one of the only Pretzel dark rides left in the world. 
Dodgems – Built 2000 – a Dodgem cars pavilion, based on the original 1927 dodgem cars. The cars are imported from Italy and the old Dodgems track is now the dance floor in the Luna Palace Function room. 
The Enterprise – Built 1979, installed 1993 – popular HUSS Enterprise ride. As HUSS no longer manufactures the ride, maintenance costs are increasing. 
Coney Drop – Built 2010, by Zamperla. The same ride is also installed at Luna Park, Coney Island, only taller and under the name Coney Tower. It is 13 metres tall.
Arabian Merry – A children's ride designed to look the same style as the entrance towers.
Luna Park Carousel – A heritage carousel built in 1913 by the renowned Philadelphia Toboggan Company in the United States (PTC #30). This is one of the few examples of their work outside the US and as with the Scenic Railway of heritage value to the culture of theme parks in the United States as well as in Australia. In the centre is a Limonaire Freres large band organ made in 1909. There are 68 horses and chariots and each horse is unique and has a name.
Spider – Built 1983, the 'Spider' model ride was first manufactured in 1967 by Eyerly Aircraft Company. It holds 24 passengers and is a flat ride that can be transported and therefore is not uncommon to be seen at carnivals. In 2001, artist and children's book author, Leigh Hobbs, designed a head to sit on the spider ride, seen today.
Pharaoh's Curse – The Pharaoh's curse is a hydraulic powered Japanese style Kamikaze Pendulum style ride at Luna Park Melbourne. It is also known as "Double Arm Ranger", "Scissors", "Skymaster" and "Sky Flyer". There are at least 5 in Australia. It first made its debut in 1984, and was manufactured by FarFabbri & Sartori.
The Power Surge – Permanently installed in 2013. Previously a seasonally operated ride.
The Road Runner – Built 2017, rotary slide ride.
Betty Choo Choo – Trackless train. The little Lunies love to ride around the park alongside their grown-ups.
Happy Swing – Built in 2020, a Zamperla Happy Swing.

Past attractions

Giggle Palace (Palais de Folies) – Built 1912, demolished 1981, destroyed by a fire lit by arsonists.
River Caves (1912–1981, demolished)
Jack'n'Jill (Water Chute) (1928 – c. 1970, demolished)
Noah's Ark (1923 – c. 1978, demolished)
Big Dipper (Rollercoaster) (1923–1989, demolished)
Whip (1923 – c. 1981 demolished)
Rotor (1951–1977, demolished)
UFO (1977–1983)
Hurricane (1982–1986)
Gravitron (1984–2001)
Zipper (1989–1995)
Ranger (1991–1992)
Polyps Octopus (1991–1993)
Ferrari 500 go kart (1984–1989)
Shoot 'Em Up Gallery (1927–2005)
Cyclone / Scat (1975–1984, 1993–2001, 2014 Seasonal Ride)
Here Comes Haley Holloway! (1988–1999)
Prison Break: Live! (Temporary Attraction)
Lara Croft – Tomb Raider Anniversary: Live! (Temporary Attraction)
Shock Drop (2001–2010) – Was replaced by the more advanced Coney Island Drop.
Metropolis (Rollercoaster) (1993–2012, dismantled)
G-Force / Disco Swing (1986–2013)
Mirror Maze – The mirror maze was made up of 75 individual mirrors. (2005-2021)
Freak Out (2015)
Body Rock
Pirates Revenge (2017)
Silly Serpent / Dragon (1989–2019, Dismantled) Powered-train Zamperla children's coaster on a looping 540ft track, was replaced by SBF Visa's own more advanced Speedy Beetle spinning coaster in 2018.
Holodeck – A Motion Simulator ride.  No longer in operation

References 

Notes
Luna Park Official History

External links

St Kilda Historical Society article
Phillips brothers biography : https://daysgoneby2.blogspot.com/2017/12/qicong-lin-flickr-phillips-brothers.html

1912 establishments in Australia
Landmarks in Melbourne
Heritage-listed buildings in Melbourne
Amusement parks in Victoria (Australia)
St Kilda, Victoria
Buildings and structures in the City of Port Phillip